Not by Chance is an album by jazz bassist Joe Martin.

Music and recording
The album was recorded at Sear Sound, New York City in January 2009. Martin was also the producer. All but one of the tracks was written by Martin. Chris Potter mostly plays tenor saxophone, but uses bass clarinet on "The Balloon Song" and soprano sax on the title track. The album was released by Anzic Records on September 15, 2009.

Track listing
"Semente" – 8:50
"In the Meantime" – 8:35
"Caché" – 8:26
"A Dream" – 9:19
"The Balloon Song" – 3:53
"Once Before" – 7:15
"Far" – 6:03
"Not by Chance" – 8:15
"The Stoic" – 8:37

Personnel 
 Chris Potter – tenor sax, soprano sax, bass clarinet
 Brad Mehldau – piano
 Joe Martin – bass
 Marcus Gilmore – drums

References 

2009 albums